New Arts, Commerce and Science College is an educational institution in Ahmednagar city of state of Maharashtra in India. The college established in 1970 by Ahmednagar Jilha Maratha Vidya Prasarak Samaj.

Objective
The main object of the institution is to provide education to the economically backward and weaker sections of the society irrespective of the caste, creed, sex and religion.

Departments
 Marathi
 Hindi
 English
 Sociology 
 Anthropology 
 History
 Economics
 Political Science
 Philosophy
 Psychology
 Defence and Strategic Studies
 Commerce
 Geography
 Physics
 Chemistry
 Botany
 Zoology
 Microbiology
 Biotechnology
 Environmental Science
 Mathematics
 Statistics
 Electronic Science
 Communication Studies
 Computer Science
 Library Science
 Physical Education

Undergraduate Courses

Bachelor of Arts (B.A.)
 Marathi
 Hindi
 English
 History
 Economics
 Political Science
 Sociology
 Anthropology 
 Philosophy
 Psychology
 Defence and Strategic Studies
 Geography

Bachelor of Science (B.Sc.)
 Geography 
 Chemistry
 Botany
 Zoology
 Computer Science
 Biotechnology
 Electronics
 Statistics

Bachelor of Commerce (B.Com.)
 Cost and works Accounting
 Marketing Management
 Cost and works Accounting (Vocational)
 Marketing Management (Vocational)

Bachelor of Business Administration (B.B.A.)
 Finance
 Marketing

Bachelor of Computer Application (B.C.A.)
Full-time three-year course, divided into six semesters.

Bachelor of Co-operative Management(B.C.M.)
Distance education mode by Y.C.M.O.U., Nasik.

Postgraduate education|Post Graduate Courses

Master of Arts (M.A.)
 English
 Economics
 Sociology 
 Psychology

Master of Science (M.Sc.)
 Physics
 Electronics
 Chemistry
 Analytical Chemistry
 Organic Chemistry
 Inorganic Chemistry
 Drug Chemistry
 Biochemistry
 Botany
 Biotechnology
 Physiology
 Mathematics
 Computer Science
 Microbiology
 Statistics

Master of Technology (M. Tech.)
 Mathematics

Master of Computer Applications (M.C.A.)

Master of Philosophy (M. Phil.)
These degree is offered by Yashwantrao Chavan Maharashtra Open University, Nashik
 Marathi
 Hindi
 English
 History
 Economics
 Political Science

Post Graduate Diploma in Mathematics (P.G.D.I.M)
 Mathematics

Diploma in Banking and Finance (D.B.F.)
One-year diploma for graduate of any stream

Other Courses
 Tourism and Travel Management
 Certificate course in tourism & travel management
 Diploma in tourism & travel management
 Advance diploma in tourism & travel management

See also
 Ahmednagar

External links
 Official Website

References

Universities and colleges in Maharashtra
Education in Ahmednagar district
Ahmednagar
Educational institutions established in 1970
1970 establishments in Maharashtra